I-177 may refer to:

 Interstate 177, a decommissioned interstate highway in Ohio, United States
 Japanese submarine I-177, a submarine of the Japanese Imperial Navy